Leopold V may refer to:

 Leopold V, Duke of Austria (1157–1194)
 Leopold V, Archduke of Austria (1586–1632), Regent of the Tyrol and Further Austria